Biharnagybajom is a village in Hajdú-Bihar county, in the Northern Great Plain region of eastern Hungary.  It has a population of 3100 people (2001) and was built on a flood plain.

Biharnagybajom was first mentioned in historical records in 1215 as two villages, Nagybajom and Kisbajom.  The village includes a thermal well containing mineral water at 49 °C.

References

Biharnagybajom